{{Infobox train
| name = British Rail Class 720Aventra
| image = Vehicles_of_the_United_Kingdom_278_(edited).jpg
| imagealt = GA Class 720 at Great Bentley in October 2021
| caption = Greater Anglia Class 720 at 
| interiorimage = Class_720574_interior_including_perch_seats.jpg
| interiorimagealt = 
| interiorcaption = Standard-class interior of a Greater Anglia Class 720
| service = 2020–present
| manufacturer = 
| factory = Derby Litchurch Lane Works
| family = Aventra
| replaced = 
| yearconstruction = 2018–present
| yearservice = 
| refurbishment = 
| yearscrapped = 
| numberconstruction = 145
| numberbuilt = 
| numberservice = 96<ref>

The British Rail Class 720 Aventra is a class of electric multiple unit (EMU) passenger train designed and produced by the rolling stock manufacturer Bombardier Transportation and Alstom. Orders for the type have been placed by both Greater Anglia and c2c.

Originally intended to be introduced during 2019, delays were encountered during development that minorly impacted this timetable. On 26 November 2020, Greater Anglia commenced the Class 720's introduction. Its initial operations were centred on the London Liverpool Street to Southend Line. All Greater Anglia units were intended to be in service by the summer of 2020. c2c's fleet is planned to enter service in 2022.

Description 
The Class 720 is a member of the rolling stock manufacturer Bombardier's Aventra family of multiple units, having been developed from the company's successful line of Electrostar electric multiple units (EMUs). In comparison to the preceding Electrostar, with which it shares numerous elements, the Class 720 is a considerably lighter vehicle, and features longer carriages: a ten-car Class 720 train is approximately the same length as a 12-car Class 360 train, the ten-car Class 720 has a tare weight of 386tonnes in contrast to the 516tonnes of the 12-car Class 360 train, while providing considerably more seating.

The driver is seated in a central position within the forward cab; a second seat is provided for an observer/instructor.

All Class 720 orders as at October 2022 have been delivered in five-car configuration. As of October 2022, no operator has chosen to configure their Class 720 fleets with first class accommodation.

The interior of Class 720 features a 3+2 seating arrangement. These seats are intentionally cantilevered above the floor to provide greater under-seat space for storing personal luggage as well as to ease cleaning. Furthermore, various amenities are present for the convenience and comfort of the travelling public. Each car benefits from air conditioning throughout, while numerous passenger information systems, displaying passenger loading indicators among other information, are present across each carriage's interior. Every seat is provided with its own seat-back table and power sockets, while on-train WiFi enables online connectivity throughout the journey. Onboard toilet facilities are also present. Akin to trains operated by the London Overground, the Class 720s have through gangways to encourage passengers to spread out across the train. The interior is also fully compliant with the Technical Specification for Interoperability for Persons of Reduced Mobility, featuring dedicated spaces for wheelchairs, as well as spaces for bicycles. One of the two toilets present in a five-car formation is also outfitted for greater accessibility.

In September 2017, Greater Anglia unveiled an early mockup of the interior intended to be fitted to the Class 720 fleet. This was used as part of a consultation that solicited 1,000 responses from members of the public. Numerous changes were subsequently made to the interior. Alterations included the replacement of the originally intended Fainsa seating with softer seating supplied by Kiel, as well as the addition of seat back tables. The units also featured underfloor heating, eliminating the need for the bodyside heaters and thus increasing floorspace for more passengers. This heating arrangement was allegedly the first use amongst any train on the British railway system.

History

Greater Anglia 
In August 2016, Greater Anglia was awarded the East Anglia franchise with a commitment to replace all of the existing fleet. As part of this, an order was placed with Bombardier for 111 electric multiple units that were members of the recently launched Aventra family. These new trains were designated as the Class 720 and were originally planned to be divided into two sub-classes; 89 five-carriage 720/5 units and 22 ten-carriage 720/1 units. However, during October 2020, Greater Anglia amended its order to convert all 22 ten-car units into a further 44 five-car units, stating that this delivered increased flexibility within the originally-ordered total of 665 vehicles.

The Class 720 is a replacement for a diverse range of units, including the Class 317 and Class 321 units, together with the more modern Class 360 and Class 379 fleets that has been long used on outer-suburban services on the West Anglia and Great Eastern Main Lines. The Class 720s are constructed at Bombardier's Derby Litchurch Lane Works. The order has been financed by the rolling stock company Angel Trains. The introduction of the fleet has been accompanied by a roughly £300million investment in new and refurbished infrastructure, affecting depots, sidings, and stations, to best accommodate the new trains.

c2c 
In December 2017, c2c announced it had reached an agreement with rolling stock financiers Porterbrook and manufacturer Bombardier to procure 60 vehicles of the latter's Aventra family—formed into six 10-car trains—with the intention that they would enter service in 2021. The order was subsequently amended to comprise twelve 5-car trains. These will be numbered in subclass 720/6, following an earlier expectation that they would be designated Class 711.

Operation

Greater Anglia 
Production of the first unit for Greater Anglia began in February 2018 and was completed in September 2018.

Early on, it had been intended for the type to enter service during 2019, but the fleet's introduction had to postponed into the following year due to software issues with the onboard Train Control Management System (TCMS). Testing of the first unit commenced on 17 March 2020, on the London Liverpool Street to Southend line.

Both the testing and production programmes were impacted by the COVID-19 pandemic that took hold during 2020. On 8 June 2020, operational use of the Class 720 was formally authorised by the Office of Rail and Road (ORR).

On 26 November 2020, the first two units started passenger service on the London Liverpool Street to Southend line,

On 16 December 2020, they started service on the Braintree branch, and on 23 December 2020, the Class 720s were rolled out on Southminster services.

In February 2021, it was reported that driver training had begun for their introduction to the Cambridge route. That same month, Ian McConnell, Greater Anglia's franchise and programmes director, noted that the Class 720 was already running relatively well and free of any meaningful technical issues, with challenges with the onboard software issues being the chief concern with the type's deployment at that point.

According to railway industry periodical Rail Engineer, Greater Anglia intend to gradually extend the new fleet's usage to eventually cover all of the Great Eastern routes in Essex and through to Ipswich during the first half of 2021, while the Class 720 would be introduced to the west Anglia route between Liverpool Street and Cambridge in the second half of the year.

On 23 March 2021, the 720s were introduced on the Liverpool Street to Clacton, Colchester Town and Ipswich services.

On 25 August 2021, Class 720s entered service on the West Anglia mainline and Hertford East branch. On 13 September 2021, the 720s started services to Harwich Town and Walton-on-the-Naze.

Fleet details

Individual vehicles are numbered as follows, with the last three digits of each vehicle number matching those of the unit to which it belongs:

European Vehicle Numbers for the fleet are devised by prefixing the domestic vehicle number with type code 94, country code 70, and a leading zero; "94700".

References

External links 

 360° interior visualisation

Bombardier Transportation multiple units
720
25 kV AC multiple units
Train-related introductions in 2020